Sugar Bush may refer to:

Sugar bush, a forest that is harvested for maple syrup.

Plants
 Sugar Bush (Rhus ovata), an evergreen shrub that grows in the southwest United States
 Common Sugarbush Protea (Protea repens)
 Protea, a genus of South African flowering shrubs often known as sugarbushes

Places

United States
 Sugar Bush Township, Becker County, Minnesota
 Sugar Bush Township, Beltrami County, Minnesota
 Sugar Bush, Brown County, Wisconsin, an unincorporated community
 Sugar Bush, Outagamie County, Wisconsin, an unincorporated community
 Sugarbush Resort, a ski resort in Vermont

Other uses
 Sugar Bush (song), a song recorded by Doris Day and Frankie Laine

See also

 
 Sugartree (disambiguation)